Guayas is a coastal province in Ecuador. It is bordered to the west by Manabí, Santa Elena, and the Pacific Ocean (as the Gulf of Guayaquil); to the east by Los Ríos, Bolívar, Chimborazo, Cañar, and Azuay; to the north by Los Ríos and Bolívar; and to the south by El Oro and the Pacific Ocean.

With a population of over 3 million people, it is the most populous province in Ecuador. In terms of area it is the seventh largest province in the country. The main port of Ecuador, Guayaquil, is located within the province.

Geography
Guayas' natural terrain is very diverse. The province has no elevations, except for the Coastal Range, which starts in Guayaquil and goes to Manabí. The areas west of the Coastal Range are desertic, with an average temperature of 23 °C. The areas east of the range belong to the Guayas Watershed. They are quite humid and fertile, especially in the north of the province, with an average temperature of 30 °C in the humid season (December–May) and 25 °C in the dry season (June–November).

Hydrography
The most important river in the province is the Daule River, which flows from the north to join the Babahoyo River to form the Guayas river. The province is part of the largest river basin in South America west of the Andes Mountains.

Roads
Guayas has its own system for numbering roads. However, this system is unknown to most residents, so it is not regularly used.

The inter-provincial roads are also numbered with the national system. Even routes travel north-south; odd routes travel east-west. The inter-provincial roads that cross the province are the following:
Ecuador Highway 15 (Vía del Pacífico; Pacific Way)
Ecuador Highway 25 (Troncal de la Costa; Coastal Main Way)
Ecuador Highway 40 (Transversal Austral; Austral Crossing Way)

History

Pre-Hispanic cultures
The native culture living in Guayas is the Huancavilca culture. Exactly before the European discovery of America, the Huancavilca Culture was living in the province. Their descendants make up a large part of the population of the province.

Spanish conquest and independence
Guayaquil was founded on August 14, 1534 (its foundation is celebrated on July 25). During the Spanish conquest, Guayaquil became one of the most important ports in South America. The city became free on October 9, 1820, and the Guayaquil Department (one of the original subdivisions of Ecuador) was founded soon afterwards. It consisted of the Manabí Province, and the Guayaquil Province, which was later renamed Guayas. The Guayaquil Province included territory of what now is Peruvian Tumbes, and today's Los Ríos and El Oro. The provinces were separated from Guayas in 1860 and 1884, respectively.

Urbanization
Guayas is the most populous province in the country. In recent decades, there has been a massive exit from rural areas to the main cities (especially Guayaquil). This has created a problem in Guayaquil, as most of the migrants move to municipal areas, creating shantytowns, with no services like water or electricity.

Demographics 
Guayas is the most populous province in the country. The estimated population of the province in 2003 was about 3,360,000 people. A large percentage of the population are mestizos, i.e. descendants of both Spanish and indigenous peoples, there are also big communities of people that descend from Italians, Lebanese and German people.

Ethnic groups as of the Ecuadorian census of 2010:
Mestizo  67.5%
Montubio  11.3%
White  9.8%
Afro-Ecuadorian  9.7%
Indigenous  1.3%
Other  0.5%

Political divisions
The province is divided into 25 cantons. The following table lists each with its population at the time of the 2010 census, its area in square kilometres (km2), and the name of the canton seat or capital.

See also 
 Provinces of Ecuador
 Cantons of Ecuador

References

External links 

 
  Gobierno Provincial del Guayas, official website

 
Provinces of Ecuador
States and territories established in 1820
1820 establishments in Gran Colombia